Narakattaramukku is a nearby place of Neerattupuram. It is situated on Neerattupuram - Muttar - Alappuzha road in the Upper Kuttanad area and on the banks of Pampa River.

References

Villages in Alappuzha district